Sex Is Comedy is a 2002 comedy-drama film written and directed by Catherine Breillat. It revolves around a director (Anne Parillaud) and her troubles filming an intimate sex scene between two actors who cannot tolerate each other.

Based on Breillat's experiences directing her 2001 film Fat Girl, the climax of the film features a recreation of a scene from that film, shot from the point of view of the crew, with Roxane Mesquida essentially reprising her role from the first film.

Cast
 Anne Parillaud as Jeanne
 Grégoire Colin as the actor
 Roxane Mesquida as the actress
 Ashley Wanniger as Léo

Reception
On review aggregator website Rotten Tomatoes, the film holds an approval rating of 68% based on reviews from 47 critics, with an average rating of 6.3/10. On Metacritic, the film has a weighted average score of 63 out of 100, based on 24 critics, indicating "generally favorable reviews".

Nev Pierce of BBC praised the direction by Catherine Breillat, writing "[She] does effectively capture the 'hurry up and wait' atmosphere of a film set, and draws excellent performances from all involved".

Ed Gonzalez of Slant Magazine called the film an "ego trip", while Roger Ebert of the Chicago Sun-Times said that he is not sure "what it's really about, or how to get there".

According to John Anderson of the Chicago Tribune "It may be impossible ever to watch a sex scene again after seeing Catherine Breillat's Sex Is Comedy. And that may precisely be the point".

In a review for The A.V. Club, Scott Tobias wrote, "Sex Is Comedy triumphs mostly in laying out the specific mechanics of a love scene", while Ruthe Stein of San Francisco Chronicle criticized the film for being "[a]nnoying, soporific and, despite its title, singularly humorless".

References

Further reading 

 Ince, Kate. (2006) ‘Is Sex Comedy or Tragedy? Directing Desire and Female Auteurship in the Cinema of Catherine Breillat’, The Journal of Aesthetics and Art Criticism, 64(1), pp. 157–164.
 Wheatley, Catherine. (2010) ‘Contested Interactions: Watching Catherine Breillat’s Scenes of Sexual Violence’, Journal for Cultural Research, 14(1), pp. 27–41. https://doi.org/10.1080/14797580903363066

External links
 
 

2002 films
2002 comedy-drama films
2000s French-language films
2000s Portuguese-language films
Arte France Cinéma films
Films about filmmaking
Films directed by Catherine Breillat
Films shot in Portugal
French comedy-drama films
Portuguese comedy-drama films
2000s French films